In linear algebra, an orthogonal diagonalization of a symmetric matrix is a diagonalization by means of an orthogonal change of coordinates.

The following is an orthogonal diagonalization algorithm that diagonalizes a quadratic form q(x) on Rn by means of an orthogonal change of coordinates X = PY.

 Step 1: find the symmetric matrix A which represents q and find its characteristic polynomial 
 Step 3: for each eigenvalue  of A from step 2, find an orthogonal basis of its eigenspace.
 Step 4: normalize all eigenvectors in step 3 which then form an orthonormal basis of Rn.
 Step 5: let P be the matrix whose columns are the normalized eigenvectors in step 4.
Then X=PY is the required orthogonal change of coordinates, and the diagonal entries of  will be the eigenvalues  which correspond to the columns of P.

References 

 Maxime Bôcher (with E.P.R. DuVal)(1907) Introduction to Higher Algebra, § 45 Reduction of a quadratic form to a sum of squares via HathiTrust

Linear algebra